is a Japanese manga series written and illustrated by Moyoco Anno. It was serialized in Kodansha's seinen manga magazine Weekly Young Magazine from 1999 to 2003, with its chapters collected in seven tankōbon volumes.

Publication
Written and illustrated by Moyoco Anno, Flowers & Bees was serialized in Kodansha's seinen manga magazine Weekly Young Magazine from 1999 to 2003. Kodansha collected its chapters in seven tankōbon volumes, released from April 6, 2000, to November 6, 2003.

In North America, the manga was licensed for English release by Viz Media. The volumes were published from October 1, 2003, to May 10, 2005.

References

Further reading

External links
 

Coming-of-age anime and manga
Kodansha manga
Romantic comedy anime and manga
Seinen manga
Viz Media manga